Reineckeia is an extinct genus of ammonoid cephalopods belonging to the family Reineckeiidae.

These fast-moving nektonic carnivores lived during the Middle Jurassic period, from the Bathonian age to the Callovian age.

Description 

Distribution 
Fossils of species within this genus have been found in the Middle Jurassic Calabozo and Los Molles Formations of Argentina, Chile, France, the Berching Formation of Germany, Portugal, Chari Formation of India, Madagascar, Switzerland and United States.

References

External links 
 Ammonites
 

Perisphinctoidea
Ammonitida genera
Jurassic ammonites of Africa
Jurassic Madagascar
Fossils of Madagascar
Jurassic ammonites of Asia
Jurassic India
Fossils of India
Jurassic ammonites of Europe
Jurassic France
Fossils of France
Jurassic Germany
Fossils of Germany
Jurassic Switzerland
Fossils of Switzerland
Jurassic ammonites of South America
Jurassic Argentina
Fossils of Argentina
Fossil taxa described in 1818